Catasetum atratum, the lustrous black catasetum, is a species of orchid found in Brazil.

References

External links

atratum
Orchids of Brazil